Krisztián Sárneczky (born 6 November 1974 in Budapest) is a Hungarian teacher of geography and prolific discoverer of minor planets and supernovae, researching at Konkoly Observatory in Budapest, Hungary. He is a board member of the Hungarian Astronomical Association (HAA) and member of the American Association of Variable Star Observers, leader of the Comet Section of the HAA, and is a contributor in the editorial work of Hungarian Astronomical Almanach.

Personal life 

In 1990 he joined the Hungarian Astronomical Association and became the Co-ordinator of the Cometary Section the same year. In 1994 he became a member of the Executive Committee and in 1996 he was appointed secretary. In 1996 he also joined the American Association of Variable Star Observers (AAVSO).

Krisztián Sárneczky has published a number of articles in the astronomy community, and has a large number of asteroid discoveries to his credit (see ).

Professional experience 

 Astrometry of comets and minor planets (including rotational light curves)
 Photometry of supernovae.

Places of field work 
 Siding Spring Observatory, NSW, Australia (visiting astronomer, 2007),
 Hungarian Astronomical Association's Polaris Observatory, Budapest, (from 2006 - )
 Baja Astronomical Observatory (visiting astronomer, 2005)
 The German-Spanish Astronomical Center at Calar Alto Observatory (visiting astronomer, 2000 and 2001)
 Observatory of Hungarian Scientific Academy Konkoly-Thege Miklós Astronomical Research Institute at Piszkéstetõ, Hungary (visiting astronomer from 1997)
 Observatory of Szeged (from 1996)

Conferences 
 GAIA-FUN-SSO-2 Workshop, September 19–21, 2012, Paris,  
 Supernovae Illuminating the Universe: from Individuals to Populations, September 10–14, 2012, Garching bei München, MPA/ESO/MPE/Excellence Cluster Universe Conference on Supernovae Illuminating the Universe: from Individuals to Populations
 IAU Colloquium 192, "Supernovae - 10 years of SN 1993J", April 22–26, 2003, Valencia,
 National Young Scientists' Conference (OTDK), second place in Physics Section, Astronomy subsection (1999),
 IAU Colloquium 173,"Evolution and Source Regions of Asteroids and Comets", August 24–28, 1998, Tatranska Lomnica,

Awards and honors 
 Eötvös Fellowship (2007)
 National Young Scientists' Conference (OTDK), first place in Physics-Earth Sciences-Mathematics Section, Astronomy I. (Solar System) subsection (2001)
 Pro Renovanda Cultura Hungariae DT 2000/43.
 National Young Scientists' Conference (OTDK), second place in Physics Section, Astronomy subsection (1999)
 Young Scientists' Conference at University of Szeged (TDK), first place in Physics Section (1998 and 2000)
 In 2017, asteroid 10258 Sárneczky was named after him

Books 
 Sváb-hegyi kisbolygók, (Márta Sragner Keszthelyiné) Az égbolt mindenkié. Budapest: Introducing the Hungarian Astronomical Association, 2005,

Publications 
 Sárneczky K., Szabó Gy., Kiss L.L.: 1999, CCD observations of 11 faint asteroids, Astronomy and Astrophysics Supplement Series, 137., 363,
 List of publications by Krisztián Sárneczky from 1999 to 2007
 List of publications by Krisztián Sárneczky from 2005 to 2013, Csillagászati hírportál,

Interview 
 The first astronomical program on the internet. 2009
 Asteroid hunter from Piszkéstető, 2010

Discoveries 

As of 2018, Krisztián Sárneczky is credited by the Minor Planet Center with the discovery and co-discovery of 379 numbered minor planets during 2000–2012. He also discovered 2022 EB5, which impacted Earth on March 11.

List of discovered minor planets 

Co-discoverers:  L. Kiss G. Szabó Z. Heiner A. Derekas S. Mészáros B. Sipőcz G. Fűrész D. Szám T. Szalai Z. Kuli B. Csák Á. Kárpáti C. Orgel A. Szing S. Kürti J. Kelemen E. Bányai

References

External links 

 Sárneczky Krisztián amateur astronomer webpage
 Asteroid hunter from Piszkéstető
 Comet Hale-Bopp finally goes dormant as it passes Neptune
 Krisztián Sárneczky
 JATE asteroid survey - numbered minor planets

1974 births
Discoverers of asteroids

21st-century Hungarian astronomers
Living people